The Murrumbidgee Valley National Park is a protected national park that is located in the Riverina region of New South Wales, in eastern Australia. The park protects part of what is now the largest continuous tract of river red gum forest in the world.

The parks fall within the Riverina bioregion.

Features
The precincts that make up the Murrumbidgee Valley River Parks are generally quite small and narrow and collectively span a large section of river frontage. They consist of a number of former state forests.

Wetlands, river red gum forests, woodlands and grasslands, all of which are found in the Murrumbidgee Valley River Parks, are widely acknowledged as among the most threatened ecosystems in Australia. The inclusion of forested wetlands in the national park system is significant given they occur only in riverine corridors and floodplains on rich alluvial soils prized for their timber and an agricultural production. The river red gum forests are an important component of the broader Murrumbidgee floodplain ecosystem. They contribute valuable ecosystem services, including carbon sequestration, in the otherwise heavily cleared bioregion. The Murrumbidgee River is highly modified due to irrigation in the region which has altered natural flooding regimes. Land use surrounding the reserves includes dry land and irrigated cropping, grazing of natural and improved pastures, and private forestry harvesting.

See also

 Protected areas of New South Wales

References

External links
 
 

National parks of New South Wales
Protected areas established in 2010
2010 establishments in Australia
Riverina
Murrumbidgee Council